Shaikhzadah or Shaikhzada (Urdu: شيخ زاده) is a Baloch tribe in Balochistan, Pakistan.

See also
 Shaikhs in South Asia

References

Social groups of Uttar Pradesh
Muslim communities of India
Shaikh clans
Social groups of Pakistan
Muslim communities of Uttar Pradesh